Luke Beveridge (born 23 August 1970) is an Australian rules football coach and former player who played for Melbourne, Footscray and St Kilda in the Australian Football League (AFL) during the 1990s. He is head coach of the Western Bulldogs.

Playing career
Small in stature, he mainly played as a rover and a forward. He is the grandson of  premiership player Jack Beveridge.

Melbourne

Beveridge played for Melbourne Football Club from 1989 until 1992, playing a total of 42 games and kicked a total of 41 goals.  Beveridge won the  first year player award in 1989 and played his most games with the club in 1991.

Footscray
He was traded to Footscray for pick 122 in the 1992 AFL Draft. He was seen as a depth player for the club's playing list. He managed 31 games in three seasons from 1993 until 1995 for Footscray Football Club.

St Kilda
His father was a recruitment officer for the club. Beveridge played 45 games for the Saints in four seasons from 1996 until 1999. Beveridge played in St Kilda's 1996 pre-season cup winning side. He played in 7 of 22 matches in the 1997 home and away rounds. St Kilda qualified in first position for the 1997 finals series. He retired at the end of the 1999 season.

AFL Greek Team of the Century
In 2002, Beveridge was elected in the AFL Greek Team of the Century for players having full or partial Greek heritage. His maternal grandfather originates from the island of Samos.

Coaching career
He began his coaching career in the Victorian Amateur Football Association competition where he coached St Bedes/Mentone Tigers to the C, B and A Grade premierships in consecutive seasons.

The C Grade premiership team of 2006 contained both of the Western Bulldogs’ only two living premiership coaches: Beveridge (2016 AFL premiership coach) in his final VAFA game as playing coach and Paul Groves (2018 AFLW premiership coach). Other notable members of the successful group include young firebrand Tim McColl, a future captain of industry at The Co. Accountants and Business Advisors, and Tim Lamb, a former battling local player who found his niche as Assistant Coach during this period. Lamb’s undeniable eye for talent led him to eventually land the role of Melbourne Football Club List Manager, where he masterminded the build of the Demons’ premiership-winning team of 2021. These and many others attribute their success in part to the guiding hand of Beveridge.

Collingwood Football Club assistant coach (2009-2010)

Hawthorn Football Club assistant coach (2012-2014)
After having a year off, Beveridge joined  in 2012 as an assistant coach under senior coach Alastair Clarkson specialising in working with the club's defence.

Western Bulldogs senior coach (2015-present)

On 14 November 2014, however, it was instead announced that he would become the senior coach of the Western Bulldogs, succeeding Brendan McCartney.

Despite being tipped by many for the wooden spoon following the loss of several key decision makers including previous coach Brendan McCartney, captain Ryan Griffen, CEO Simon Garlick, former Brownlow Medallist Adam Cooney and over 700 games of experience at the end of 2014, as well as losing reigning best and fairest Tom Liberatore to a knee injury during the pre-season that would ultimately sideline him for the entire 2015 season, Beveridge led an impressive resurgence by the Western Bulldogs, which finished in sixth place on the ladder at the end of the 2015 season, and hence qualified for their first finals series since 2010, before losing to the Adelaide Crows in an elimination final at the Melbourne Cricket Ground. For his efforts, Beveridge was named the AFL Coaches Association coach of the year.

The following year in the 2016 season, Beveridge led the Western Bulldogs to a victory premiership win in the 2016 AFL Grand Final, when they defeated the Sydney Swans by a score of 13.11 (89) to 10.7 (67), by margin of 22 points. This was the club's second premiership since 1954 despite them suffering long-term injuries throughout the season, notably captain Robert Murphy. The Bulldogs had finished 7th in the minor premiership. They played in three consecutive elimination finals, two of them interstate. On the path to the grand final, they beat the West Coast Eagles at Domain Stadium, Hawthorn at the MCG and Greater Western Sydney at Spotless Stadium. In an emotional display which, according to The Age, "will undoubtedly go down as one of the great moments in Australian sporting history", Beveridge handed his coach's premiership medal to Murphy, saying, "This is yours, mate. You deserve it more than anyone." Murphy, though thankful, returned the medal the following day. It has since been placed in the Western Bulldogs museum. Later that month, Beveridge won the Spirit of Sport award at the Sport Australia Hall of Fame Awards for his gesture to Murphy. He was also named the AFL Coaches Association coach of the year for the second year running.

In the 2021 season, Beveridge coached the Western Bulldogs to the 2021 AFL Grand Final, but fell short and lost to Melbourne by a margin of 74 points with the final score Melbourne 21.14 (140) to Western Bulldogs 10.6 (66).

Statistics

Playing statistics

|-
|- style="background-color: #EAEAEA"
! scope="row" style="text-align:center" | 1989
|style="text-align:center;"|
| 48 || 12 || 7 || 4 || 77 || 47 || 124 || 16 || 9 || 0.6 || 0.3 || 6.4 || 3.9 || 10.3 || 1.3 || 0.8
|-
! scope="row" style="text-align:center" | 1990
|style="text-align:center;"|
| 24 || 3 || 1 || 0 || 14 || 4 || 18 || 4 || 1 || 0.3 || 0.0 || 4.7 || 1.3 || 6.0 || 1.3 || 0.3
|- style="background-color: #EAEAEA"
! scope="row" style="text-align:center" | 1991
|style="text-align:center;"|
| 24 || 21 || 27 || 8 || 250 || 90 || 340 || 40 || 23 || 1.3 || 0.4 || 11.9 || 4.3 || 16.2 || 1.9 || 1.1
|-
! scope="row" style="text-align:center" | 1992
|style="text-align:center;"|
| 24 || 6 || 6 || 2 || 73 || 33 || 106 || 18 || 7 || 1.0 || 0.3 || 12.2 || 5.5 || 17.7 || 3.0 || 1.2
|- style="background-color: #EAEAEA"
! scope="row" style="text-align:center" | 1993
|style="text-align:center;"|
| 19 || 8 || 8 || 5 || 95 || 40 || 135 || 18 || 19 || 1.0 || 0.6 || 11.9 || 5.0 || 16.9 || 2.3 || 2.4
|-
! scope="row" style="text-align:center" | 1994
|style="text-align:center;"|
| 19 || 12 || 14 || 13 || 117 || 34 || 151 || 29 || 23 || 1.2 || 1.1 || 9.8 || 2.8 || 12.6 || 2.4 || 1.9
|- style="background-color: #EAEAEA"
! scope="row" style="text-align:center" | 1995
|style="text-align:center;"|
| 19 || 11 || 7 || 7 || 69 || 33 || 102 || 16 || 13 || 0.6 || 0.6 || 6.3 || 3.0 || 9.3 || 1.5 || 1.2
|-
! scope="row" style="text-align:center" | 1996
|style="text-align:center;"|
| 27 || 16 || 16 || 9 || 153 || 78 || 231 || 46 || 31 || 1.0 || 0.6 || 9.6 || 4.9 || 14.4 || 2.9 || 1.9
|- style="background-color: #EAEAEA"
! scope="row" style="text-align:center" | 1997
|style="text-align:center;"|
| 27 || 7 || 4 || 3 || 25 || 9 || 34 || 7 || 5 || 0.6 || 0.4 || 3.6 || 1.3 || 4.9 || 1.0 || 0.7
|-
! scope="row" style="text-align:center" | 1998
|style="text-align:center;"|
| 27 || 18 || 13 || 5 || 111 || 62 || 173 || 42 || 23 || 0.7 || 0.3 || 6.2 || 3.4 || 9.6 || 2.3 || 1.3
|- style="background-color: #EAEAEA"
! scope="row" style="text-align:center" | 1999
|style="text-align:center;"|
| 27 || 4 || 4 || 0 || 41 || 35 || 76 || 16 || 4 || 1.0 || 0.0 || 10.3 || 8.8 || 19.0 || 4.0 || 1.0
|- class="sortbottom"
! colspan=3| Career
! 118
! 107
! 56
! 1025
! 465
! 1490
! 252
! 158
! 0.9
! 0.5
! 8.7
! 3.9
! 12.6
! 2.1
! 1.3
|}

Coaching statistics
Statistics are correct to round 12, 2021

|- style="background-color: #EAEAEA"
! scope="row" style="font-weight:normal"| 2015
|
| 23 || 14 || 9 || 0 || 60.9% || 6 (elimination finals) || 18
|-
! scope="row" style="font-weight:normal"| 2016
|
| 26 || 19 || 7 || 0 || 73.1% || 7 (premiership) || 18
|- style="background-color: #EAEAEA"
! scope="row" style="font-weight:normal"| 2017
|
| 22 || 11 || 11 || 0 || 50% || 10 || 18
|- 
! scope="row" style="font-weight:normal"| 2018
|
| 22 || 8 || 14 || 0 || 36.4% || 13 || 18
|- style="background-color: #EAEAEA"
! scope="row" style="font-weight:normal"| 2019
|
| 23 || 12 || 11 || 0 || 52.2% || 7 (elimination finals)|| 18
|-
! scope="row" style="font-weight:normal"| 2020
|
| 18 || 9 || 9 || 0 || 55.6% || 7 (elimination final)|| 18
|- style="background-color: #EAEAEA"
! scope="row" style="font-weight:normal"| 2021
|
| 23 || 18 || 8 || 0 || 69.6% || 5 (grand final) || 18
|- class="sortbottom"
! colspan=2| Career totals
! 157
! 91
! 67
! 0
! 57.32%
! colspan=2|
|}

Notes

Honours and achievements

Playing honours
Individual
Harold Ball Memorial Trophy: 1989

Coaching honours
Team
AFL premiership coach: 2016
Individual
Jock McHale Medal: 2016
All-Australian: 2016
2× AFL CA Coach of the year: 2015, 2016
Spirit of Sport Award: 2016

References

External links

DemonWiki profile

1970 births
Living people
Australian rules footballers from Victoria (Australia)
Melbourne Football Club players
St Kilda Football Club players
Western Bulldogs players
Western Bulldogs coaches
Western Bulldogs Premiership coaches
Australian people of Greek descent
All-Australian coaches
One-time VFL/AFL Premiership coaches